Nizhny Mamon is a rural locality (a selo) and the administrative center of Nizhnemamonskoye 1-ye Rural Settlement, Verkhnemamonsky District, Voronezh Oblast, Russia. There are 34 streets.

Geography 
Nizhny Mamon is located 11 km east of Verkhny Mamon (the district's administrative centre) by road. Prirechnoye is the nearest rural locality.

References 

Rural localities in Verkhnemamonsky District